Tump is an English word meaning a hillock, mound, barrow or tumulus. 

Tump may also refer to: 

TuMP, a hill in the United Kingdom with a Thirty and upwards Metre Prominence 
 "The Tump", a location in the fictional city-state of Ankh-Morpork in the Discworld series

See also 
 Tumpline, a strap over the forehead used for carrying loads
 Trump (disambiguation)